Chapelhall railway station served the village of Chapelhall, North Lanarkshire, Scotland from 1887 to 1930 on the Airdrie to Newhouse Branch.

History 
The station opened at 07:00 by the Caledonian Railway. To the west was the goods yard and to the north of the southbound platform was the signal box. The station closed at 23:15.

References

External links 

Disused railway stations in North Lanarkshire
Former Caledonian Railway stations
Railway stations in Great Britain opened in 1887
Railway stations in Great Britain closed in 1930
1887 establishments in Scotland
1930 disestablishments in Scotland